Vivek Sagar Prasad (born 25 February 2000) is an Indian field hockey player who plays as a midfielder for the Indian national team.

In January 2018, he became the second-youngest player ever to debut for India at 17 years, 10 months and 22 days. At the 2019 Hockey Stars Awards, Prasad was named the FIH Rising Star of the Year. At the 2020-21 FIH Player of the Year Awards, he was named the FIH Young Player of the Year.

International career
Prasad scored the equalizing goal for India in the 42nd minute in the final of the 2018 Champions Trophy against Australia, a match that India went on to lose in the penalties. At the 2019 FIH Series Finals in Bhubaneswar, Prasad was named the best young player at the tournament. In December 2019, he was nominated for the FIH Rising Star of the Year Award. He won the award by getting 34.5 per cent of the votes and he became the first Indian player to win an FIH Award. He was part of the Indian team that won the bronze medal at the 2020 Olympic Games.

References

External links
Vivek Prasad at Hockey India

2000 births
Living people
Indian male field hockey players
Male field hockey midfielders
Field hockey players from Madhya Pradesh
People from Hoshangabad district
Olympic field hockey players of India
Field hockey players at the 2020 Summer Olympics
Field hockey players at the 2018 Asian Games
Asian Games bronze medalists for India
Asian Games medalists in field hockey
Medalists at the 2018 Asian Games
Field hockey players at the 2018 Summer Youth Olympics
Olympic bronze medalists for India
Medalists at the 2020 Summer Olympics
Olympic medalists in field hockey
Field hockey players at the 2018 Commonwealth Games
Field hockey players at the 2022 Commonwealth Games
Commonwealth Games silver medallists for India
Commonwealth Games medallists in field hockey
Recipients of the Arjuna Award
2023 Men's FIH Hockey World Cup players
Medallists at the 2022 Commonwealth Games